Djallonké or Djallonke may refer to:

 Djallonké people, also known as the Yalunka people
 The Djallonké or West African Dwarf sheep
 Djallonké or West African Dwarf goats